Eagan may refer to:

People
 Daisy Eagan (born 1979), American actress
 Dennis Eagan (1926–2012), British field hockey player
 Eddie Eagan (1897–1967), American sportsman
 James Eagan (1926-2000), American politician from Missouri
 John J. Eagan (politician) (1872–1956), American politician from New Jersey
 John J. Eagan (industrialist), American industrialist and co-founder of the American Cast Iron Pipe Company
 Kevin Eagan (born 1954), American soccer defender
 Margery Eagan (born 1954), American talk radio host
 Truck Eagan (1877–1949), American baseball infielder
 James Eagan Holmes (born 1987), American mass murderer

Places
Eagan, Minnesota, United States, a suburb of Minneapolis-Saint Paul
Eagan, Tennessee, United States, an unincorporated community
Eagan, Kyle of Lochalsh, Scottish mountain

See also
 Aegan 
 Egan (disambiguation)
 Egen (disambiguation)
 Eagan (disambiguation)